German submarine U-844 was a Type IXC/40 U-boat of Nazi Germany's Kriegsmarine, built for service during the Second World War. An extremely short-lived boat, U-844 served just ten days on her only patrol and was sunk with two other boats whilst preparing for a failed attack on a well-defended convoy within range of allied air support.

Design
German Type IXC/40 submarines were slightly larger than the original Type IXCs. U-844 had a displacement of  when at the surface and  while submerged. She had two shafts and two  propellers.

U-844 was fitted with six  torpedo tubes (four fitted at the bow and two at the stern), 22 torpedoes, one  SK C/32 naval gun, 180 rounds, and a  SK C/30 as well as a  C/30 anti-aircraft gun. The boat had a complement of forty-eight.

Service history
Built by the large DeSchiMAG AG Weser shipyards in Bremen, U-844 was rapidly completed and readied for service, her entire building program taking just under a year. Given to Oberleutnant zur See Günther Möller, she passed her initial working-up and training schedule well, and was dispatched to her first patrol in the Atlantic Ocean in the first week of October 1943 to try to stem the terrible losses being incurred by U-boats at this time.

War Patrol
The boats had to travel on the surface to have any hope of reaching their target, and it was this which caused disaster, as the three submarines were spotted in broad daylight by a RAF B-24 Liberator aircraft, which rapidly called allies in the form of more Liberators from 59 Squadron and 86 Squadron Royal Air Force amongst other forces.

Fate
On 16 October 1943, during the day-long battle which followed, the anti-aircraft weapons of the boats were brought into use, downing two Liberators and killing a number of crewmen. It was not however enough to stave off the inevitable, and one by one the boats were separated and sunk, having been prevented from diving by constant attention from Allied aircraft. U-844 was eventually lost to a direct hit from a bomb dropped by a Liberator, the boat blowing to pieces and killing all 53 of her crew.

Wolfpacks
U-844 took part in one wolfpack, namely:
 Schlieffen (16 October 1943)

References

Bibliography

External links

German Type IX submarines
World War II shipwrecks in the Atlantic Ocean
World War II submarines of Germany
U-boats sunk by British aircraft
U-boats commissioned in 1943
1942 ships
U-boats sunk in 1943
Ships built in Bremen (state)
Ships lost with all hands
Maritime incidents in October 1943